The United States Post Office Old Chelsea Station, originally known as "Station O", is a historic post office building located at 217 West 18th Street in Chelsea, Manhattan, New York City. It was built in 1935, and designed by consulting architect Eric Kebbon  for the Office of the Supervising Architect. The building is a seven-bay-wide two-story brick building, trimmed in limestone in the Colonial Revival style.  The main entrance features a ten light transom, Doric order pilasters, and a blind stone fanlight with carved eagles. The interior features two bas relief cast stone panels of woodland animals titled "Deer" and "Bear" executed in 1938 by artist Paul Fiene.

The building was listed on the National Register of Historic Places in 1989.

References
Notes

External links

Old Chelsea
Government buildings completed in 1935
Colonial Revival architecture in New York City
Chelsea, Manhattan
1935 establishments in New York City